Calosima lucidella is a moth in the family Blastobasidae. It is found in the US state of Florida.

References

Moths described in 1989
lucidella